Super De Luxe is the second studio album by the Scottish indie rock band Attic Lights, released in May 2013 on Elefant Records.

Francis MacDonald, of Teenage Fanclub and BMX Bandits fame, assisted with production along with producer and engineer Jim Lang.

Track listing
All songs written by Attic Lights
 "Say You Love Me" – 4:14		
 "Future Bound" – 4:05		
 "Breathe For Me" – 4:23		
 "Stay Before You Leave" – 3:41		
 "Mona Lisa" – 4:16		
 "Don't You" – 2:37		
 "Hit And Miss" – 2:55		
 "Lock Me Out" – 3:32		
 "Orbison" – 3:30		
 "Gabrielle" – 4:48

Personnel
 Kev Sherry - vocals, guitar, keyboards
 Colin McArdle - vocals, bass, guitar
 Jamie Houston - vocals, guitar, piano 
 Tim Davidson - guitar, pedal steel guitar 
 Noel O'Donnell - vocals, drums, glockenspiel 
 Jim Lang - additional guitars and keyboards
 Francis MacDonald - producer, additional percussion 
 John McLaughlin - producer
 Jim Lang - producer and engineer, 
 Dave Thomas Jnr - additional programming and mixing

Attic Lights albums
2013 albums